Mueang Ang Thong is the capital district (amphoe mueang) of Ang Thong province, central Thailand.

History
In the past, the district was called Mueang District. It was established in concert with the construction of the Ang Thong provincial hall, opposite Wat Chai Songkhram, Tambon Ban Hae, on the west bank of the Chao Phraya River.

In 1813 King Rama II ordered Chao Phraya Aphai Phuthon (เจ้าพระยาอภัยภูธร) to build a dam on the Chao Phraya River to manage water levels in Khlong Bang Kaeo for transportation all year. But the project did not succeed. So the provincial hall was moved opposite the mouth of Khlong Bang Kaeo on the east bank of the Chao Phraya River. The Mueang District office was moved at the same time. In 1917 the district was renamed from Mueang to Bang Kaeo after the name of the central tambon. The district office was moved out of Ang Thong's provincial hall in 1926 to a new location about 300 m south of the provincial hall. In 1938 the government renamed the district Mueang Ang Thong District.

Geography
Neighboring districts are (from the south clockwise): Pa Mok, Wiset Chai Chan, Pho Thong, and Chaiyo of Ang Thong Province and Maha Rat of Ayutthaya province.

The important water resources are the Chao Phraya and Khlong Bang Kaeo.

Administration
The district is divided into 14 sub-districts (tambons), which are further subdivided into 81 villages (mubans). Ang Thong itself is a town (thesaban mueang) and covers tambons Talat Luang and Bang Kaeo as well as parts of tambons' Sala Daeng, Ban Hae, Ban It, Pho Sa, and Yansue. The sub-district municipality (thesaban tambon) Phosa covers tambons Phosa, and Sala Daeng those parts of the tambon'' Sala Daeng not covered by the town Ang Thong. There are a further eight tambon administrative organizations (TAO).

References

External links
amphoe.com (Thai)

Mueang Ang Thong